Moqdadiyeh (also Romanized as Moqdādīyeh) is a village in Hakimabad Rural District, in the Central District of Zarandieh County, Markazi Province, Iran. At the 2006 census, its population was 45, in 10 families.

References 

Populated places in Zarandieh County